Shamil Magomedovich Kudiyamagomedov (born May 9, 1993, in Dagestan) is a retired Russian Naturalized Italian amateur wrestler  of Avar heritage, who won the gold medal in men's freestyle 86 kg at the 2015 Military World Games. He is Russian national champion (2013), Italian national champion (2018), silver medalist of Summer Universiade 2013 in Kazan. Junior World Championships bronze medalist 2012. He won bronze medal with an injured leg. International Master of Sports in Freestyle Wrestling. He competed in the freestyle 84 kg event at the 2013 World Wrestling Championships, after defeated Adrian Jaoude from Brazil in the Round of 64, he was eliminated by Olympic bronze medalist Ehsan Lashgari in the Round of 32. In 1/2 final European Championships U23 he lost 7-6 his teammate of Magomedgadzhi Khatiyev, but went on to wrestle back and win a bronze medal against Fatih Erdin of Turkey. At the Memorial Heydar Aliyev 2014 (Golden Grand Prix Baku) he beat in final Ehsan Lashgari. In 2016 he won European Championships. In 2020 Shamil announced his retirement

Championships and accomplishments
Junior level:
2012 Junior World Championships bronze medalist – 84 kg
 Senior level:
2012 Ali Aliyev Memorial – 84 kg
2013 Russian Nationals – 86 kg
2013 Kazan Summer Universiade 2013 runner-up – 84 kg
2014 World Cup silver medalist – 86 kg
2014 Russian Nationals runner-up – 86 kg
2014 Golden Grand Prix Ivan Yarygin runner-up – 86 kg
2014 Ali Aliyev Memorial - 86 kg
2014 Ramzan Kadyrov Cup - 86 kg
2014, 2016 Golden Grand-prix Baku - 86 kg
2015 European Championships U23 bronze medalist – 86 kg
2015 Russian Nationals runner-up – 86 kg
2015 Ali Aliyev Memorial – 86 kg
2015 Military World Games gold medalist – 86 kg
2016 Golden Grand Prix Ivan Yarygin winner – 86 kg
2016 European Wrestling Championships - gold medal – 86 kg
2016 World Cup silver medalist – 86 kg
2016 Military World Championship Gold Medalist – 86 kg
 Senior level:
2018 Italian National Freestyle Wrestling Championships – 86 kg
2018 XXII Outstanding Ukrainian Wrestlers and Coaches Memorial 3rd – 86 kg
Dan Kolov & Nikola Petrov 3rd – 86 kg
2018 European Wrestling Championships - bronze medalist – 86 kg

References

Living people
Avar people
1993 births
People from Kizlyar
Russian male sport wrestlers
Universiade medalists in wrestling
Universiade silver medalists for Russia
European Wrestling Championships medalists
Medalists at the 2013 Summer Universiade
Sportspeople from Dagestan